Tigray for Democracy and Justice Party (TDJP) is a political party primarily based in the Tigray Region, struggling against the TPLF government of Ethiopia. Particularly after the end of the Ethiopian 2005 elections, TDJP decided to scale up its work to bring real democracy to the people of Ethiopia. TDJP believes in the respect for human rights, justice and democracy. It believes that all Ethiopians should have their voices heard and that the one-party state should end.

Policies 
TDJP does not believe in the secession policies of TPLF and OLF but at the same time it believes Oromos should have the most say in the country in order for popular vote to succeed. It also understands that Oromiffa and Tigrinya should be equally an official language and working language in the capitals.
 
It is against secession because that policy harms the unity of the nation. TDJP believes in liberal democracy. In general, TDJP does not believe a peaceful struggle will bring change because the TPLF regime is inhumane, intolerant and unapproachable. Therefore, along with other Tigray opposition groups, TDJP is waging a guerrilla war against the TPLF troops in northern Ethiopia.

Status
TDJP has bases in northern Ethiopia as well as in very well organized networks in Addis Ababa and Gondar. The organization is mostly financed by Diaspora Tigray Ethiopians in the United States and Europe.

References

Ethnic political parties in Ethiopia
Political parties in Ethiopia